Alto Colorado (Spanish for Upper Colorado) is a Chilean village located  northeast of Pichilemu, Cardenal Caro Province.

References

Populated places in Pichilemu